SHQ or shq may refer to:

 SHQ, the IATA code for Southport Airport, Queensland, Australia
 SHQ, the Pinyin code for Shanghai Hongqiao railway station, Shanghai, China
 SHQ, the station code for Shori railway station, Balochistan, Pakistan
 shq, the ISO 639-3 code for Sala language, Zambia
 Spejbl and Huvínek Quintet